Alcanzar una estrella ("To reach a star") is a Mexican telenovela first broadcast on Canal de las Estrellas in 1990. Also broadcast in Latin America and on Univision in the United States, the telenovela tells the story of an introverted girl's infatuation with her teen idol. The leading roles were played by singers Mariana Garza and Eduardo Capetillo, ex-members of the Mexican pop band Timbiriche. The two also sang the theme songs, which were written by Ricardo Arjona. Arjona and other singers such as Patricia Manterola (from the group  Garibaldi) also made acting cameos. The story was produced by Luis de Llano, producer and manager of Timbiriche and Garibaldi, and written by actress Rita Macedo, de Llano's mother. Alcanzar una estrella turned out to be Macedo's last credit as an actress before she committed suicide in the mid-1990s.

Alcanzar una estrella won a TVyNovelas Award for "Best Telenovela of the Year" in 1991. Its success led to the making of a film, Más que alcanzar una estrella, and a sequel telenovela Alcanzar una estrella II starring Sasha Sokol and Ricky Martin. In 2012, American network Nick at Nite remade it as Hollywood Heights.

Plot
Lorena (Mariana Garza) is an introverted girl who dreams of "reaching a star" - that star being singer Eduardo Casablanca (Eduardo Capetillo). She gets to meet him at a press conference to present his latest album and his first telenovela. Lorena begins to write anonymous letters to Eduardo while her classmates ridicule her bad looks. Eduardo struggles to maintain a relationship with his gold digger girlfriend Déborah (Kenia Gazcón).

Cast

Soundtrack
 Alcanzar una estrella (album)

Awards

References

External links 
 
 Alcanzar una estrella at the telenovela database
 Alcanzar una estrella

1990 telenovelas
Mexican telenovelas
1990 Mexican television series debuts
1990 Mexican television series endings
Spanish-language telenovelas
Television shows set in Mexico City
Televisa telenovelas